Sidakeni Secondary School is a rural co-educational secondary school in Sidakeni ward of Kwekwe District.

It was established in 1981.

It is 64 km southwest of  Kadoma and 92 km northwest-north of Kwekwe by road.

The school's name comes from the name of the village in which the school is situated. "Sidakeni" is a Ndebele adjective
meaning a muddy place (esidakeni). The soil at this location is mud dull-grey in colour.

Sidakeni High School offers educational services from Form 1 to 6.

Alumni

Somandla Ndebele a sungura musician now based in Harare did secondary education here before relocating to Dzivarasekwa for high school.

See also
 Zhombe Sidakeni Ward
 Sidakeni Schools
 List of schools in Zimbabwe Zhombe Secondary Schools

References

Schools in Zimbabwe